Kazunori (written: 一慶, 一典, 一則, 一謙, 一徳, 一矩, 一紀, 和典, 和則, 和徳, 和行, 和範 or 和憲) is a masculine Japanese given name. Notable people with the name include:

, Japanese samurai
, Japanese footballer
, Japanese anime screenwriter and artist
, Japanese footballer
, Japanese sumo wrestler
, Japanese high jumper
, Japanese judoka
, Japanese politician
, Japanese actor
, Japanese baseball player
, Japanese politician
, Japanese video game designer
, Japanese actor
, Japanese mixed martial artist and judoka
, Japanese footballer

Japanese masculine given names